Miguel Alejandro Escobar (born 24 August 1995) is an Argentine footballer who plays as an attacking midfielder for General Caballero JLM.

Career
After youth spells with Los Polleros and Banfield, Escobar started his pro career in Argentina with the latter. He first appeared on the club's substitutes bench for an Argentine Primera División draw with Atlético de Rafaela in October 2014. He made his professional debut on 16 February 2016 in a league match versus Quilmes, with his only other appearance in 2016 coming against Godoy Cruz just over a week later. In July 2016, Escobar joined Defensores de Belgrano of Primera B Metropolitana on loan. He scored two goals in twenty-one games.

August 2017 saw Escobar join Maltese Premier League side Senglea Athletic. His first appearance for Senglea came in a 0–1 defeat to Valletta on 25 August. In total, he played five times for Senglea. In January 2018, Escobar signed for Primera B de Chile team Magallanes. He netted his first Magallanes goal during a Copa Chile match with Tomás Greig FC in May. A move to JJ Urquiza was completed in the following August. After spending the 2019–20 campaign with Sportivo Belgrano, Escobar headed to Los Andes in October 2020.

Career statistics
.

References

External links

1995 births
Living people
Argentine footballers
Argentine expatriate footballers
People from Moreno Partido
Association football midfielders
Sportspeople from Buenos Aires Province
Argentine Primera División players
Primera B Metropolitana players
Maltese Premier League players
Primera B de Chile players
Torneo Federal A players
Club Atlético Banfield footballers
Defensores de Belgrano footballers
Senglea Athletic F.C. players
Deportes Magallanes footballers
Asociación Social y Deportiva Justo José de Urquiza players
Sportivo Belgrano footballers
Club Atlético Los Andes footballers
Expatriate footballers in Malta
Expatriate footballers in Chile
Expatriate footballers in Paraguay
Argentine expatriate sportspeople in Malta
Argentine expatriate sportspeople in Chile
Argentine expatriate sportspeople in Paraguay